The Rensselaer RP-2 (for Rensselaer Polytechnic design 2) is an American mid-wing, single-seat glider that was designed by Steven J. Winckler and produced by the Rensselaer Polytechnic Institute of Troy, New York.

Design and development
The RP-2 was the second aircraft in Rensselaer's Composite Aircraft Program and first flew in 1985.

The aircraft is of mixed construction, made from carbon-fiber-reinforced polymer, Kevlar and fiberglass. Its  span wing employs a Boeing 80-163 airfoil and features split flaps. The aircraft weighs just  empty. The landing gear consists of a conventional glider-style monowheel. The aircraft achieved a 29:1 glide ratio.

Operational history
Initially registered with the Federal Aviation Administration in the Experimental - Amateur-built category, by August 2011 the sole RP-2 built had been removed from the registry.

Specifications (RP-2)

See also

References

1980s United States sailplanes
Aircraft first flown in 1985
Mid-wing aircraft